Neodexiopsis is a genus of house flies, insects in the family Muscidae. There are at least 80 described species in Neodexiopsis.

Species
These 89 species belong to the genus Neodexiopsis:

 Neodexiopsis alacris Couri & Albuquerque, 1979 c g
 Neodexiopsis antennata Couri, 1987 c g
 Neodexiopsis arizona Snyder, 1958 i c g
 Neodexiopsis barbiventris Couri & Albuquerque, 1979 c g
 Neodexiopsis basalis (Stein, 1898) i c g
 Neodexiopsis borea Snyder, 1958 i c g
 Neodexiopsis brasiliensis (Walker, 1853) c g
 Neodexiopsis brevicornis (Malloch, 1934) c
 Neodexiopsis cacumina Snyder, 1957 c g
 Neodexiopsis calopyga (Loew, 1872) i c g b
 Neodexiopsis cavalata Snyder, 1957 c g
 Neodexiopsis cera Snyder, 1958 c g
 Neodexiopsis cinerea Costacurta, Couri & Carvalho, 2005 c g
 Neodexiopsis cirratipila Snyder, 1957 c g
 Neodexiopsis clavacula Snyder, 1957 c g
 Neodexiopsis crassicrurus Snyder, 1957 c g
 Neodexiopsis crispiseta Snyder, 1957 c g
 Neodexiopsis croceafrons Snyder, 1957 c g
 Neodexiopsis declivis (Stein, 1904) c g
 Neodexiopsis devia (Curran, 1934) c
 Neodexiopsis discolorisexus Snyder, 1957 c g
 Neodexiopsis ditiportus Snyder, 1957 c g
 Neodexiopsis ebenifemus Snyder, 1957 c g
 Neodexiopsis emmesa (Malloch, 1934) c g
 Neodexiopsis equator Snyder, 1958 c g
 Neodexiopsis erecta Costacurta, Couri & Carvalho, 2005 c g
 Neodexiopsis facilis Costacurta, Couri & Carvalho, 2005 c g
 Neodexiopsis flavipalis Albuquerque, 1956 c g
 Neodexiopsis flavipes (Williston, 1896) c g
 Neodexiopsis floridensis (Malloch, 1920) i c g
 Neodexiopsis fulvifrontis Couri & Albuquerque, 1979 c g
 Neodexiopsis geniculata (Bigot, 1885) c g
 Neodexiopsis genupuncta (Stein, 1904) c g
 Neodexiopsis hilaris (Huckett, 1966) i c g
 Neodexiopsis hydrotaeiformis Snyder, 1958 c g
 Neodexiopsis intoniclunis Snyder, 1957 c g
 Neodexiopsis lanigera (Stein, 1918) c g
 Neodexiopsis latifrons (Thomson, 1869) c g
 Neodexiopsis legitima Costacurta, Couri & Carvalho, 2005 c g
 Neodexiopsis lineata (Stein, 1904) c
 Neodexiopsis longipilis (Albuquerque, 1954) c g
 Neodexiopsis lunatisigna Snyder, 1957 c g
 Neodexiopsis macrocera (Wulp, 1896) i c g
 Neodexiopsis magnicornis Snyder, 1958 c g
 Neodexiopsis major (Malloch, 1920) i c g b
 Neodexiopsis maldonadoi Snyder, 1957 c g
 Neodexiopsis micans Snyder, 1957 c g
 Neodexiopsis microchaeta (Malloch, 1934) c g
 Neodexiopsis neoaustralis Snyder, 1957 c g
 Neodexiopsis neoflavipes Snyder, 1957 c g
 Neodexiopsis neomacrocera Snyder, 1957 c g
 Neodexiopsis novissimum Couri & Albuquerque, 1979 c g
 Neodexiopsis obtusilora (Malloch, 1934) c g
 Neodexiopsis oculata (Stein, 1911) c g
 Neodexiopsis oscillans (Wulp, 1896) c g
 Neodexiopsis ovata (Stein, 1898) i c g b
 Neodexiopsis paranaensis Costacurta, Couri & Carvalho, 2005 c g
 Neodexiopsis parvula Albuquerque, 1958 c g
 Neodexiopsis paulistensis Albuquerque, 1956 c g
 Neodexiopsis pectinata Couri & Albuquerque, 1979 c g
 Neodexiopsis pectoralis (Huckett, 1934) i c g
 Neodexiopsis peninsula Snyder, 1958 i c g
 Neodexiopsis peruviana Snyder, 1958 c g
 Neodexiopsis pilosa (Stein, 1904) c g
 Neodexiopsis ponti Couri, 1987 c g
 Neodexiopsis preacuta Snyder, 1958 c g
 Neodexiopsis priscipagus Snyder, 1958 c g
 Neodexiopsis punctulata (Wulp, 1896) i c g
 Neodexiopsis pura Costacurta, Couri & Carvalho, 2005 c g
 Neodexiopsis quintivena Snyder, 1957 c g
 Neodexiopsis rara Costacurta, Couri & Carvalho, 2005 c g
 Neodexiopsis rava Snyder, 1957 c g
 Neodexiopsis recedens (Stein, 1904) c g
 Neodexiopsis rex Curran, 1928 c g
 Neodexiopsis rufitibia (Stein, 1919) i c g
 Neodexiopsis setilamina (Huckett, 1966) i c g
 Neodexiopsis setipuncta Snyder, 1957 c g
 Neodexiopsis sima Snyder, 1957 c g
 Neodexiopsis similis Costacurta, Couri & Carvalho, 2005 c g
 Neodexiopsis simplicissima Pont, 1988 i g
 Neodexiopsis subtilis Couri & Albuquerque, 1979 c g
 Neodexiopsis sulina Couri, 1987 c g
 Neodexiopsis tenuicornis (Wulp, 1896) c g
 Neodexiopsis uber Costacurta, Couri & Carvalho, 2005 c g
 Neodexiopsis uspallata Snyder, 1957 c g
 Neodexiopsis vitilis (Giglio-Tos, 1894) c g
 Neodexiopsis vittiventris (Albuquerque, 1955) c g
 Neodexiopsis vulgaris Couri & Albuquerque, 1979 c g
 Neodexiopsis willistoni Snyder, 1958 c g

Data sources: i = ITIS, c = Catalogue of Life, g = GBIF, b = Bugguide.net

References

Further reading

External links

 

Muscidae genera
Articles created by Qbugbot